"A Sorta Fairytale" is a song written and performed by singer-songwriter Tori Amos. It was released as the first single from her 2002 album Scarlet's Walk. The song reached number 14 on the Billboard Bubbling Under Hot 100 Singles chart, and number one on the Triple A (adult album alternative) chart. The song has since been featured in episodes of the television shows Nip/Tuck and The L Word. There are three commercially released versions of the song: the album version (5:30), the 101 Mix (4:00) and the original single version (4:01). It was released as a CD single (UK/Canada) with "Operation Peter Pan" as the B-side, and as a DVD single (US) with the music video, co-starring Adrien Brody.

Song information
From the promotional CD Scarlet Stories:

In a 2009 interview, Amos was asked about the meaning of one of the lines:

Music video
The music video, directed by Sanji, features Amos, as a head attached to a disembodied leg, falling in love with another head attached to a disembodied arm (played by Adrien Brody). The two creatures show signs of romantic interest in one another, until the arm accidentally hurts the leg's feelings by laughing at her crooked fifth toe. The leg then flees by jumping onto a passing skateboard, and ends up alone on a deserted beach. The arm finds her and they consummate their love with a deep kiss. The act of kissing causes the arm and leg to suddenly start swelling up and grow their extra body parts—they finally become complete, "whole" humans by realizing their love.

Track listing

Maxi-CD single (UK and Canada)
 "A Sorta Fairytale" (101 Mix)
 "Operation Peter Pan"
 "A Sorta Fairytale" (original single version)*
 "A Scarlet Story" (Enhanced CD multimedia)

7" single (US)
 "A Sorta Fairytale" (single version)* (on both sides)

*The "single version" and "original single version" are identical though titled differently.  Issued with a picture sleeve.  Disc has small center hole

DVD single (US)
 "A Sorta Fairytale" music video (digitally mastered)
 Tori Amos biography
 Making of "A Sorta Fairytale"
 Interview segment (with Amos)

Charts

Weekly charts

Year-end charts

References

Tori Amos songs
Tori Amos video albums
Songs written by Tori Amos
2002 singles
2002 songs
2003 video albums
Music videos directed by Sanji (director)
Epic Records singles
2000s ballads